Alain Rodrick Miyogho (born 24 October 2000) is a Gabonese international footballer who plays for Mangasport, as a midfielder.

Career
He has played club football for Mangasport.

He made his international debut for Gabon in 2018.

References

2000 births
Living people
Gabonese footballers
Gabon international footballers
AS Mangasport players
Association football midfielders
21st-century Gabonese people